Anvar Boynazarov (born January 10, 1989) is an Uzbek Muay Thai kickboxer and mixed martial artist. He has previously competed in kickboxing for the Glory promotion, and holds notable victories over Giga Chikadze, Fabio Pinca and Abdellah Ezbiri. In mixed martial arts, Boynazarov has most recently competed for the Legacy Fighting Alliance.

Kickboxing career 
Anvar Boynazarov was born in Samarqand, Uzbekistan on January 10, 1989. During his youth, Boynazarov began his fighting career by training in Muay Thai with his brother Firdavs. The most notable highlight of his career came when he upset Fabio Pinca during the tournament semi finals at Glory 47: Lyon. Despite being seen as a heavy underdog in the fight he managed to knock out Pinca with a heavy left hook during the second round which earned him the KO of the Night award and the comeback-of-the-year award by Combatpress.com. Following this upset, Boynazarov advanced to the finals where he met Abdellah Ezbiri. Ezbiri won the fight by a decision.

Following this, Anvar fought for the Glory interim Featherweight title against Kevin VanNostrand. VanNostrand won the fight by a first round KO.

After these two losses he fought in China during EM Legend 27, where he faced Thodkhui MR.Manas. Thodkhui won the fight by a split decision.

He then fought in the EM Legend Featherweight Tournament. He won a unanimous decision against Pan Jiayun to earn a place in the tournament finals. He won the final bout against Meng Guodong with a third round body shot KO.

During Glory 67 Anvar fought the incumbent Glory Featherweight champion Petpanomrung Kiatmuu9. Petpanomrung won the fight by a unanimous decision.

Mixed martial arts career 
Boynazarov made his mixed martial arts debut against Henry Crapp at Combat Night Pro 19 on December 12, 2020. He won the fight by a first-round knockout. Boynazarov followed this up with another first-rounds stoppage victory, as he knocked Rob Fuller out in 99 seconds at Combat Night Pro 20 on March 13, 2021.

Boynazarov faced John Pham at LFA 121 on January 14, 2022. He won the fight by a first-round stoppage, needing just 21 seconds to knock Pham out.

Boynazarov faced Erik Silva on August 9, 2022 at Dana White's Contender Series 49. He lost the fight via ground and pound TKO stoppage early in the first round.

Championships and awards 
Kickboxing
EM Legend
2018 EM Legend Featherweight Tournament Championship -65 kg
2017 EM Legend 18 Featherweight Tournament Championship -65 kg
2016 EM Legend 10 Featherweight Tournament Championship -65 kg
Glory
Glory 47: Lyon KO of the Night
Glory 47: Lyon Featherweight Contender Tournament Runner-Up

Muay Thai
World Muay Thai Federation
2013 WMF Featherweight World Championship -65 kg
2010 WMF Featherweight World Championship -65 kg

Accomplishments
2017 Combat Press Kickboxing Awards: Comeback of the Year

Mixed martial arts record

|-
|Loss
|align=center|3–1
|Erik Silva
|TKO (elbows and punches)
|Dana White's Contender Series 49
|
|align=center|1
|align=center|1:32
|Las Vegas, Nevada, United States
|
|-
|Win
|align=center|3–0
|John Pham
|KO (knee and punches)
|LFA 121
|
|align=center|1
|align=center|0:21
|Dallas, Texas, United States
|
|-
|Win
|align=center|2–0
|Rob Fuller
|TKO (knee and punches)
|Combat Night Pro 20
|
|align=center|1
|align=center|1:39
|Orlando, Florida, United States
|
|-
|Win
|align=center|1–0
|Henry Crapp
|TKO (punches)
|Combat Night Pro 19
|
|align=center|1
|align=center|1:10
|Tallahassee, Florida, United States
|

Kickboxing & Muay Thai record

|-  style="background:#fbb;"
| 2019-07-05 || Loss ||align=left| Petpanomrung Kiatmuu9 || Glory 67: Orlando || Orlando, United States || Decision (Unanimous) || 5 || 3:00
|-
!  style=background:white colspan=9 |
|-  style="background:#cfc;"
| 2019-03-09 || Win ||align=left| Abdellah Ezbiri || Glory 64: Strasbourg || Strasbourg, France || Decision (Unanimous) || 3 || 3:00
|-  style="background:#cfc;"
| 2018-09-14 || Win ||align=left| Bailey Sugden || Glory 58:Chicago || Chicago, USA || Decision (Split) || 3 || 3:00
|- style="background:#fbb;"
| 2018-08-10|| Loss ||align=left| Serhiy Adamchuk || Glory 56: Denver || Colorado || Decision (unanimous) || 3 || 3:00
|-  style="background:#cfc;"
| 2018-04-21 || Win ||align=left| Meng Guodong || EM Legend Featherweight Tournament Final || Leshan, China || KO (Left Hook to the Body) || 3 || 3:00
|-
!  style=background:white colspan=9 |
|-  style="background:#cfc;"
| 2018-04-21 || Win ||align=left| Pan Jiayun || EM Legend Featherweight Tournament Semi Final || Leshan, China || Decision (Unanimous) || 3 || 3:00
|- style="background:#fbb"
| 2018-01-20 || Loss ||align=left| Thodkhui MR.Manas || EM Legend 27 || Kunming, China || Decision (Split) || 3 || 3:00
|-  style="background:#fbb;"
|2017-12-01 || Loss||align=left| Kevin VanNostrand || Glory 48: New York || New York, United States || KO (Knee to the Body) || 1 || 1:06
|-
!  style=background:white colspan=9 |
|-  style="background:#fbb;"
| 2017-10-28|| Loss ||align=left| Abdellah Ezbiri || Glory 47: Lyon Featherweight Contender Tournament Finals || Lyon, France || Decision|| 3 || 3:00
|-
! style=background:white colspan=9 |
|- style="background:#cfc"
| 2017-10-28 || Win ||align=left| Fabio Pinca || Glory 47: Lyon Semi Finals || Lyon, France || KO (Left Hook) || 2 || 1:52
|-
! style=background:white colspan=9 |
|- style="background:#cfc"
| 2017-08-05 || Win ||align=left| Narong || Topking World Series || Su-ngai Kolok, Thailand || Decision (Unanimous) || 5 ||
|- style="background:#cfc"
| 2017-07-09 || Win ||align=left| Marlon Dos Santos || Topking World Series || Chongqing, China || TKO || 1 ||
|- style="background:#cfc"
| 2017-05-27 || Win ||align=left| Thodkhui MR.Manas || EM Legend 19 || Chengdu, China || Decision (Unanimous) || 3 || 3:00
|- style="background:#cfc"
| 2017-04-28 || Win ||align=left| Igor Liubchenko || EM Legend 18 Tournament Final || Chengdu, China || TKO (Referee Stoppage) || 2 || 
|-
!  style=background:white colspan=9 |
|- style="background:#cfc"
| 2017-04-28 || Win ||align=left| Mo Abdurahman || EM Legend 18 Tournament Semi Finals || Chengdu, China || Decision (Unanimous) || 3 || 3:00
|- style="background:#fbb"
| 2016-12-10 || Loss ||align=left| Morgan Adrar || Phoenix Fighting Championship || Keserwan, Lebanon || Decision (Unanimous) || 5 || 3:00
|- style="background:#fbb"
| 2016-11-19 || Loss ||align=left| Julio Lobo || Thai Fight Airrace 1 || Ban Chang, Thailand || Decision (Unanimous) || 5 || 3:00
|- style="background:#cfc"
| 2016-09-23 || Win ||align=left| Quade Taranaki || EM Legend 12 || Leshan, China || KO || 2 ||
|- style="background:#fbb"
| 2016-08-20 || Loss ||align=left| Saenchai || Thai Fight Phra Chom Klao Ladkrabang || Bangkok, Thailand || Decision (Unanimous) || 5 || 3:00
|- style="background:#cfc"
| 2016-07-09 || Win ||align=left| Kunchai || EM Legend 10 Tournament Final || Nanchong, China || Decision (Unanimous) || 3 || 3:00
|-
!  style=background:white colspan=9 |
|- style="background:#cfc"
| 2016-07-09 || Win ||align=left| Levan Shaishmelashvili || EM Legend 10 Tournament Semi Final || Nanchong, China || KO || 1 ||
|- style="background:#cfc"
| 2016-06-05 || Win ||align=left| Maykol Yurk || EM Legend 9 || Chengdu, China || Decision (Unanimous) || 3 || 3:00
|- style="background:#cfc"
| 2015-08-07 || Win ||align=left| Coke Chunhawat || Lion Fight 27 || Temecula, United States || Decision (Unanimous) || 5 || 3:00
|- style="background:#fbb;"
| 2015-09-19|| Loss ||align=left| Serhiy Adamchuk || Dynamite || San Jose, United States || Decision (Unanimous) || 3 || 3:00
|- style="background:#cfc"
| 2015-08-07 || Win ||align=left| Giga Chikadze || Glory 23: Las Vegas || Las Vegas, Nevada, US || Decision (split) || 3 || 3:00
|- style="background:#cfc"
| 2015-04-04 || Win ||align=left| Ngokun Saiyok Muaythaigym || Thai Fight || Nakhon Nayok, Thailand || TKO (Right Flying Knee) || 2 ||
|- style="background:#cfc"
| 2015-01-04 || Win ||align=left| Sakultong Sltpantong || Sunday Championship Night || Phuket, Thailand || TKO (Punches) || 4 ||
|- style="background:#cfc"
| 2014-12-23 || Win ||align=left| Lampet Sitsongpeenong || Tuesday Championship Night || Phuket, Thailand || TKO (Right Hook) || 2 ||
|- style="background:#cfc"
| 2014-12-14 || Win ||align=left| Mongkol Kor Kumpanart || Max Muay Thai || Thailand || Decision (Unanimous) || 5 || 3:00
|- style="background:#fbb"
| 2014-11-19 || Loss ||align=left| Ninwisset Sumalee || Wednesday Championship Night || Phuket, Thailand || Decision (Unanimous) || 5 || 3:00
|-  style="background:#fbb;"
| 2014-08-13 || Loss ||align=left| Craig Dickson || Wednesday Championship Night || Phuket, Thailand || KO (Right Elbow) || 3 ||
|- style="background:#fbb"
| 2014-05-30 || Loss ||align=left| Jose Neto || Toyota Marathon || Surat Thani, Thailand || Decision (Unanimous) || 5 || 3:00
|- style="background:#fbb"
| 2014-04-15 || Loss ||align=left| Tukkataong Phetpaytai || Andaman League || Thailand || TKO (Leg Kick) || 1 ||
|- style="background:#cfc"
| 2013-10-26 || Win ||align=left| Petkwanjai Sit Or || Lumpinee Stadium || Bangkok, Thailand || KO (Left Hook) || 5 ||
|- style="background:#cfc"
| 2013-08-28 || Win ||align=left| Florian Breau || Wednesday Championship Night || Phuket, Thailand || Decision (Unanimous) || 5 ||
|- style="background:#fbb"
| 2013-06-28 || Loss ||align=left| Seeoui Sor Sunantachai || Muay Thai Warriors || Chiang Mai, Thailand || KO (Elbows) || 2 ||
|- style="background:#fbb"
| 2013-05-31 || Loss ||align=left| Vahid Shahbazi || Toyota Marathon || Kanchanaburi, Thailand || KO ||  ||
|- style="background:#cfc"
| 2013-05-31 || Win ||align=left| Mathias Gallo Cassarino || Toyota Marathon || Kanchanaburi, Thailand || Decision (Unanimous) || 5 || 3:00
|- style="background:#fbb;"
| 2013-04-28|| Loss ||align=left| Rafi Bohic || 9th Anniversary Bangla Boxing Stadium || Phuket, Thailand || TKO (Referee Stoppage) || 3 || 
|-
! style=background:white colspan=9 |
|- style="background:#cfc"
| 2013-03-23 || Win ||align=left| Maxim Federkov || WMF World Championship Tournament Final || Bangkok, Thailand ||  ||  || 
|-
! style=background:white colspan=9 |
|- style="background:#cfc"
| 2013-03-23 || Win ||align=left| Hafed Romdhane || WMF World Championship Tournament Semi Finals || Bangkok, Thailand || Decision (Unanimous) || 5 || 3:00
|- style="background:#cfc"
| 2013-01-06 || Win ||align=left| Munggronpet Dragon Muaythai Gym || Sunday Championship Night || Phuket, Thailand || KO (Left Hook) || 1 ||
|- style="background:#fbb"
| 2012-12-15 || Loss ||align=left| Panfar Tor Chantraroj || Muaythai World Fighter Spirit || Bangkok, Thailand || Decision (Unanimous) || 5 || 3:00
|-  style="background:#fbb;"
| 2012-11-14 || Loss ||align=left| Rafi Bohic || Bangla Stadium || Phuket, Thailand || KO || 2 ||
|- style="background:#cfc"
| 2012-11-01 || Win ||align=left| RIT Tiger Muaythai || Bangla Stadium || Phuket, Thailand || KO (Right Cross) || 2 ||
|- style="background:#fbb"
| 2012-10-17 || Loss ||align=left| Chalamkaw || Bangla Stadium || Phuket, Thailand || Decision (Unanimous) || 5 || 3:00
|- style="background:#cfc"
| 2012-09-25 || Win ||align=left| Stephen Meleady || Petchyindee Fight Lumpinee Stadium|| Bangkok, Thailand || Decision (Unanimous) || 5 || 3:00
|- style="background:#fbb"
| 2012-08-29 || Loss ||align=left| Deachkalon Sumalee Boxing Gym || Wednesday Championship Night || Phuket, Thailand || Decision (Unanimous) || 5 || 3:00
|- style="background:#fbb;"
| 2012-01-15|| Loss ||align=left| Keo Rumchong || Khmer Fight || Phnom Penh, Cambodia || TKO (Injury) || 1 ||
|-
| colspan=9 | Legend:

See also
 List of male kickboxers

References

1989 births
Living people
Uzbekistani male kickboxers
Featherweight kickboxers
Glory kickboxers
Uzbekistani male mixed martial artists
Mixed martial artists utilizing Muay Thai
Uzbekistani Muay Thai practitioners
Sportspeople from Tashkent